In the following there are lists of sites of notable radio transmitters.  During the early history of radio many countries had only a few high power radio stations, operated either by the government or large corporations, which broadcast to the population or to other countries. Because of the large number of transmission sites, this list is not complete. Outside of Europe senders and repeater stations are emphatically presented from international services.

Legend

Europe

Austria

Belarus
Molodecno (VLF)

Belgium
 Schoten (FM, TV) 
Wavre (MW, SW shut down) FM DAB TV)
Overijse (MW closed)

Bosnia and Herzegovina
Mostre transmitter (MW)

Bulgaria
Kaliakra (MW)
Vakarel (LW, MW)

Croatia
Grbre transmitter (MW)
Deanovec transmitter (MW, KW)

Czech Republic
Liblice (LW closed 1.1.2021)
Liblice (MW closed)
Topolná (LW dismantled)
Mělník-Chloumek (MW closed)
Dobrochov (MW closed)
Jested (FM)

Denmark
Kalundborg (LW, MW)

Finland
Lahti (LW, SW, shut down)
Pori transmitter (LW, SW shut down)
Pasilan linkkitorni (DVB-T)
Anjalankoski Radio and TV-Mast (FM, DVB-T)
Eurajoki TV Mast (DVB-T)
FM- and TV-mast Helsinki-Espoo (FM, DVB-T)
Haapavesi TV Mast (DVB-T)
Hollola TV Mast (DVB-T)
Kuopio Radio and TV Mast (FM, DVB-T)
Lapua Radio and TV-Mast (FM, DVB-T)
Oulu TV Mast (DVB-T)
Pihtipudas TV Mast (DVB-T)
Smedsböle Radio Mast (FM)
Teisko TV-mast (DVB-T)
Tervola Radio and TV-Mast (FM, DVB-T)
Turku radio and television station (FM, DVB-T)
Jyväskylä TV-mast (DVB-T)

France
Allouis (LW, SW)
Le Blanc (VLF)
Issoudun (SW)
Paris-Eiffel Tower (FM, TV)
Lyon-Metallic tower of Fourvière (FM, TV)
Sélestat (MW shut down)
HWU transmitter (LW, SW)
Col de la Madone transmitter (LW, SW)
Lafayette transmitter (VLF)
Limeux transmitting station (FM, TV)
TV Mast Niort-Maisonnay (TV)
Transmitter Le Mans-Mayet (FM, TV)
Realtor transmitter (MW)
Sud Radio Transmitter Pic Blanc (MW)
Pic de Nore transmitter (FM, TV)

Germany

Baden-Württemberg

Bavaria

Berlin

Brandenburg

Bremen
Mediumwave transmitter Bremen (MW, shut down)

Hamburg
Hamburg-Billstedt ( FM, TV)
Heinrich-Hertz-Turm (FM, TV)

Hesse

Mecklenburg-Western Pomerania

Lower Saxony

North Rhine-Westphalia

Rhineland-Palatinate

Saarland
Heusweiler (MW, shut down)
Longwave transmitter Europe 1 (LW, Europe 1, shut down)
Göttelborner Höhe (FM, TV)

Saxony-Anhalt
Brocken (FM, TV)
Burg (LW, MW, shut down)
Dequede (FM, TV)
Goliath transmitter (VLF, dismantled)

Saxony
Wiederau ( FM, TV)
Wilsdruff (shut down)
Dresdner Fernsehturm (FM, TV)
Deutschlandsender Herzberg/Elster (LW, demolished)

Schleswig-Holstein

Thuringia
Wachenbrunn (MW, shut down)
Inselsberg (FM, TV)
Bleßberg (FM, TV)

Greece
Kavala (SW, MW, (IBB))
Rhodes (SW, (IBB))

Hungary
Budapest-Lakihegy (MW)
Solt (MW)
Kékes (TV)

Iceland
Hellissandur (LW)

Ireland
Athlone (MW, shut down)
Cairn Hill (DVB-T, FM)
Clarkstown (LW)
Clermont Carn (DVB-T,DAB, FM)
Holywell Hill (DVB-T, FM)
Kippure (DVB-T, DAB, FM)
Maghera (DVB-T, FM)
Mount Leinster (DVB-T, FM)
Mullaghanish (DVB-T, FM)
Spur Hill (DVB-T,DAB, FM)
Three Rock (DVB-T,DAB, FM)
Truskmore (DVB-T, FM)
Tullamore (MW, shut down)

Italy
Santa Palomba (MW)
Caltanissetta (LW, SW shut down)
Santa Maria di Galeria (MW, SW, Vatican Radio)

Luxembourg
Hosingen (FM)
Junglinster (LW, SW)
Beidweiler (LW)
Marnach (MW)
Dudelange (TV, FM)

Macedonia
Ovce Pole (Skopje transmitter, MW)

Malta
Delimara Transmitter (MW, KW, shutdown)

Monaco
Roumoules (LW, MW, SW)

Netherlands
Lopik (2 sites: MW, FM, TV)
Flevoland (MW)
Smilde (FM, TV)

Norway
 Kvitsøy (MW, SW shut down)
 Ingøy (LW shut down)
 Vigra (MW shut down)
 Helgeland (VLF)
 Noviken VLF Transmitter (VLF)
 Tyholttårnet (DAB)
 Tryvannstårnet (FM)
 Skavlen Transmitter (DAB, DVB-T)
 Høiåsmasten (DAB, DVB-T)

Poland
 Raszyn (LW)
 Konstantynow (LW, shut down)
 Solec Kujawski (LW)
 Gliwice (MW, shut down)
 Przebędowo (MW, shut down)
 Wola Rasztowska (Warszawa III) (MW, shut down)
 Radom longwave transmitter
 Stolp radio transmitter (dismantled)

Portugal
 Muge (MW)
 Muro (FM, TV)
 Monsanto (Lisboa) (FM, TV)
 Monte da Virgem (Porto) (FM, TV)

Romania
Brasov-Bod (LW)

Russia
Bolshakovo (MW) (Voice of Russia)
Krasnodar (SW) (Voice of Russia)
Taldom (LW, SW)
Krasny Bor (LW, MW, SW)

Serbia
Stubline (MW, KW)

Slovakia
Nitra (MW)

Slovenia
Domžale (MW)

Sweden
 Motala (LW, shut down)
 Orlunda (LW, shut down)
 Ruda (VLF)
 Grimeton (VLF, FM, TV)
 Multrå (FM, TV)
 Hörby (SW, FM, TV)
 Sölvesborg (MW shut down)

Switzerland

Spain

Turkey 
 Büyükejder (TV, FM)
 Karadağ (TV, FM)

United Kingdom

Middle East

Syria
Izza Radio Tower

Africa

Algeria
Tipaza Longwave Transmitter (LW)
Beshar (LW)
Oragla (MW / LW)

Morocco
 Tanger (SW) (Relay station IBB)
 Nador (LW, SW) Radio Medi

Rwanda
 Kigali (SW) (Relay station DW)

Asia & South Asia

Hong Kong
Temple Hill (TV)
Mount Gough (FM)
Kowloon Peak (TV, FM)
Golden Hill (TV, FM, MW)
Castle Peak (TV, FM)
Cloudy Hill (TV, FM)
Lamma Island (TV, FM)
Beacon Hill (FM)
Peng Chau (MW)

Indonesia
 TVRI Tower (TV)

Japan
 Yamata (SW) (Radio Japan)
 Tokyo Tower (TV FM)

North Korea
 Pyongyang TV Tower (TV, FM)
 Kujang (SW) (Voice of Korea)

Northern Mariana Islands
IBB Robert E. Kamosa SW Transmitting Station :
Saipan transmitter site 3x100kW (former Superrock KYOI site)
Tinian transmitter site 6x500kW, 2x250kW

Pakistan
 Radio Pakistan (MW, SW, FM)

Philippines
 Millennium Transmitter (UHF/VHF TV) (ABS-CBN Corporation)
 Tower of Power (UHF/VHF TV, FM) (GMA Network Inc.)
 TV5 Transmitter Tower (UHF/VHF TV) (TV5 Network Inc.)
 Transmitter Tower (TV) (People's Television Network)
 South Tower (TV) (Radio Philippines Network)
 IBC 13 Transmitter Tower (TV) (Intercontinental Broadcasting Corporation)
 Tinang (SW) (Relay station IBB)
 Malolos (SW) (Relay station Radyo Pilipinas Worldwide, Voice of America)
 Malolos (MW) (Radyo Veritas, Transmitter No. 1 demolished because of mall construction, Transmitter No. 2 still functional)
 Malolos (MW) (PBS, houses both DZRB and DZSR)
 Bocaue (SW) (Relay station FEBC)
 Bocaue (MW) (FEBC, houses DZAS)
 Iba (SW) (Relay station FEBC)
 Poro Point (SW) (Relay station IBB)
 Antipolo (TV, FM)
 Mount Santo Tomas, Tuba, Benguet (TV, FM)
 Mt. Busay, Cebu City (TV, FM)
 Shrine Hills, Davao City (TV, FM)

Singapore
 Kranji (SW) (Relay station BBC World Service)
 Bukit Batok (FM,TV) (Mediacorp)

Sri Lanka
 Iranawila (SW) (Relay station IBB)
 Trincomalee (SW) (Relay station DW)

South Korea
 Namsan Tower (TV, FM)
 Gimje (SW) (KBS World Radio)

Thailand
 Udon Thani (SW) (IBB)

Latin America

Ecuador
 Quito (SW)  (HCJB)

North America

Canada
 Sackville (SW) (RCI) (shut down)

United States
Aguada transmission station (VLF)
VLF Transmitter Cutler (VLF)
Delano (SW) (VoA, Radio Martí) (shut down)
Greenville (SW) (VoA, Radio Martí)
Lualualei VLF transmitter (VLF)
Marathon (MW) (Radio Martí)
Camp Evans (VLF, shut down)
Voice of America Bethany Relay Station (SW) (shut down)
NIST Station WWV - Fort Collins, Colorado (SW)
NIST Station WWVH - Kekaha, Hawaii (SW)
Armstrong Tower
Hughes Memorial (FM)
KCTV (TV)
Star Tower (FM, TV)
Sutro Tower (FM, TV)
WBNS (FM, TV)
WITI (FM, TV)
WOR (FM, TV)
WTVR (FM, TV)

Australasia

Australia
 Brandon (SW)
 Canarvon (SW)
 Shepparton (SW)

New Zealand
 Mount Cargill (FM, DVB-T)
 Mount Kaukau (FM, DVB-T)
 Rangitaiki (SW)
 Sky Tower (Auckland) (FM, DVB-T)
 Sugarloaf (FM, DVB-T)
 Titahi Bay (MW)

See also
Telecommunications towers in the United Kingdom

Transmission sites